Gorges Lowther (1768 – 23 February 1854) was an Irish Member of Parliament.

He represented Ratoath in the Irish House of Commons from 1790 to 1798.

He was the son of George Lowther of Kilrue, County Meath, by his wife Frances, daughter of Chambré Brabazon Ponsonby.

References
 https://web.archive.org/web/20090601105535/http://www.leighrayment.com/commons/irelandcommons.htm
 http://www.stirnet.com/HTML/genie/british/ll/lowther3.htm

1769 births
1854 deaths
Members of the Parliament of Ireland (pre-1801) for County Meath constituencies
Irish MPs 1790–1797
Irish MPs 1798–1800